Cucullia lucifuga is a species of moth of the family Noctuidae. It is found in north, central and southern Europe east to Japan. It is also present in Tibet and Armenia.

The wingspan is 38–55 mm. There is one generation per year in the north, with adults on wing from May to June. In the warmer regions in the south, there is a second generation with adults on wing from July to August and a partial third generation with adults in October.

The larvae feed on various Asteraceae (or Compositae) species, including Tussilago farfara, Petasites paradoxus, Cirsium arvense, Centaurea phrygia, Sonchus arvensis, Hieracium umbellatum and Taraxacum species.

External links

Fauna Europaea
Species info on Schmetterlinge und ihre Ökologie 
Lepiforum.de

Cucullia
Moths of Asia
Moths of Europe
Taxa named by Michael Denis
Taxa named by Ignaz Schiffermüller
Moths described in 1775